KM Sobhan (25 July 1924 – 31 December 2007) was a Bangladeshi justice, diplomat and activist. He was a former justice of the Bangladesh Supreme Court. He also served as the Bangladeshi ambassador to Germany and Czechoslovakia.

Career
Sobhan was appointed as a judge in 1971.

Sobhan had two sons, Kazi Adnan Sobhan and Kazi Rehan Sobhan and a daughter, Rumana Nahid Sobhan. On 31 December 2007, Sobhan fell sick while walking at Ramna Park and later died  of cardiac arrest at Birdem Hospital in Dhaka. He was buried in  Mirpur Martyred Intellectuals' Graveyard.

References

1924 births
2007 deaths
People from Faridpur District
Ambassadors of Bangladesh to East Germany
Ambassadors to Czechoslovakia
Bangladeshi judges
Bangladeshi activists
Burials at Mirpur Martyred Intellectual Graveyard